A Natural Environment Area (NEA) is a unit of the Park Service of the Maryland Department of Natural Resources. These public lands are generally  or more in extent and are judged to constitute a "significant natural attraction or unique geological feature". Development within an NEA is generally confined to trails, interpretive facilities and limited support facilities.

In contradistinction to Maryland Wildlands, which may only be established or removed by an act of the Maryland General Assembly, NEAs are designated by the DNR. (The more restrictive and protective designation of a Maryland Wildland, however, is sometimes established within an NEA.)

List of Maryland NEAs

, the state of Maryland managed seven NEAs covering  of land.

See also
List of Maryland state forests
List of Maryland state parks
List of Maryland wildlife management areas
Maryland BayStat

References

External links
Maryland Park Service

Nature reserves in Maryland